Andrew Kania (born December 7, 1967) is a former Canadian Member of Parliament for the electoral district of Brampton West, in Ontario. Kania was elected in the 2008 Canadian federal election, winning as the Liberal Party candidate in the riding vacated by Liberal Colleen Beaumier.

Kania was a member of the Standing Committee on Public Safety and National Security; the Liaison Committee, which has a supervisory role over all parliamentary committees; and also the House Joint Chair of the Standing Joint Committee for the Scrutiny of Regulations.

Biography
Kania received his first law degree from the University of Toronto and then completed his Master of Laws at University of Leicester. He joined the Ontario Bar in 1991. Kania was elected secretary of the Ontario Bar Association, which represents more than 17,000 lawyers. He was also a past instructor of law at the Bar Admission Course at the Law Society of Upper Canada.

Kania was the outreach director and Ontario co-chair for Stéphane Dion's 2006 leadership campaign, and the national outreach director for Michael Ignatieff's 2008 leadership campaign.

Electoral record

References

External links
Official website on Wayback Machine, February 27, 2011

Living people
1967 births
21st-century Canadian politicians
Alumni of the University of Leicester
Liberal Party of Canada MPs
Members of the House of Commons of Canada from Ontario
Politicians from Brampton
Politicians from Toronto
University of Toronto alumni